Ouara is one of three departments in Ouaddaï, a region of Chad. Its capital is Abéché.

Departments of Chad